Crazy Peoples Right to Speak is the third album by English new wave band Kajagoogoo, released in 1985 by Parlophone. The album was not a commercial success and failed to make the UK Top 100. The only single from the album, "Shouldn't Do That", reached No. 63 in the UK.

Background
For this release, the band had shortened its name to Kaja, a name the band had previously used for the U.S. release of their second album, Islands. By this time, the band was a three-piece, as drummer Jez Strode had quit in 1984.

After the failure of the album, the band split up in late 1985. However, after the band was featured on the VH1 program Bands Reunited in 2004, renewed interest in Kajagoogoo prompted EMI to re-issue the band's three studio albums, including Crazy Peoples Right to Speak. The album was remastered and four bonus tracks were added to the original ten tracks: two remixes of "Shouldn't Do That", and two tracks that were previously only available in the single's limited edition gatefold double pack release in 1985.

Track listing
All music written by Askew, Beggs and Neale. Lyrics by Beggs.

Side one
"Do I" – 3:25
"Shouldn't Do That" – 3:17
"Your Appetite" – 4:21
"Rivers" – 4:34
"Sit Down and Shut Up" – 3:53

Side two
"Afraid of You" – 3:51
"Jigsaw" – 3:50
"Fear of Falling" – 3:13
"Charm of a Gun" – 4:26
"You Really Take My Breath Away" – 4:53

2004 CD bonus tracks
"Shouldn't Do That (Disciplined)" – 6:58
"Shouldn't Do That (Undisciplined)" – 5:57
"Hurricane" – 3:55
"Whatever You Want" – 3:42

Personnel

Kaja
Nick Beggs – lead vocals, bass guitar, Chapman Stick, percussion 
Steve Askew – guitar, EBow, sitar, vocals
Stuart Neale – keyboards, drum programming, vocals

Additional musicians
Dave Mattacks – drums
Luís Jardim – percussion ("Jigsaw")
Michael Thompson – guitar solos ("Your Appetite", "Charm of a Gun")
Annie McCaig – backing vocals ("Your Appetite", "Jigsaw")
Lezlee Cowling – backing vocals ("Fear of Falling", "Charm of a Gun", "You Really Take My Breath Away")

Technical
Ken Scott – producer
Alan Moulder – engineer (Trident)
Chris Sheldon – engineer (Utopia)
Gordon Fütter – engineer (Good Earth)
Heff Moraes – engineer (Sarm West)
John Jacobs – engineer (AIR)
Mike Laurdie – engineer (AIR)
Nigel Walker – engineer (AIR)
Pabini – engineer (Total Access)
Wyn Davis – engineer (Total Access)
Paul Ryan – mixing
Kaja – mixing (tracks 1–10, 13, 14)
The Square Red Studio – original design
The Red Room – re-issue design
Dave Fathers – illustration
Trevor Key – photographer
Peter Ashworth – Kaja photographer
Nigel Reeve – re-issue project coordination
Kathy Bryan – mastering

References

External links
 KajaFax - The Officially Approved Kajagoogoo Community & Fan Club
 Unofficial Limahl & Kajagoogoo YouTube video archives

1985 albums
Kajagoogoo albums
Albums produced by Ken Scott
EMI Records albums